Korean ballad, also known as K-ballad (often simply referred to by South Koreans as ballad), is a style of music in South Korea and a genre in which soul and rhythm and blues music is transformed to suit Korean sentiment. It became popular in the 1980s, and has influenced and evolved into many different music styles.

Background 
Stemming from the international sentimental ballad, the Korean popular ballad has become a nationally recognized and supremely popular music style in Korea. Power ballads from the West, including songs from Barbra Streisand and Lionel Richie, nurtured the growth and popularity of ballads as a genre in Korea. Gaining popularity alongside trot in the 1960s, the ballad is distinguished as "a slow love song built on a Western seven-note scale". However, it was not until the 1980s that the ballad song style became popularized in mainstream Korean culture. From its popularity throughout Korean media, the Korean ballad has influenced and evolved into many different music styles.   

According to an analysis of ballad songs in Made in Korea: Studies in Popular Music, ballads tend to have the following music style: "intro-A (verse)-A-B-chorus-interlude-A (B)-chorus-bridge-chorus-outro.....[where]...The verse, or section A, was usually composed of eight bars, and its repetition was labeled as A. Section A usually began quietly and transitioned into section B, or the chorus. The bridge before the last chorus helped to escalate the emotions by modulating to a different key or through a grander arrangement. Lastly, in the outro, the accompaniment would come to a full stop or fade out."While still maintaining themes relating to love and loss, songs at the intersections of ballad and other genres can include nontypical instruments or vary in musical style and level of expression.

Popular ballad singers in Korean history include Lee Moon-se, Hye Eun-yi, and Lee Sun-hee.

Intersections with other music styles

Ballad and trot 

As the "background music of the Park era" (in reference to the Park Chung-hee dictatorship from 1963 to 1979), trot music was also an extremely popular music style in Korea. Having gained popularity during the Japanese colonial period of Korea, its foreign influences included Western instruments and the Japanese pentatonic minor scale. Popular trot singers notably include Cho Yong-pil, and used a faster paced and fun music style that evolved many times throughout modern Korean history to gain popularity amongst consumers. Due to the skills necessary to sing trot songs, popular singers moved towards ballads for their "easy-listening" style. Unlike trot songs, which derive singing techniques like vibration and pitch changes from older styles like pansori, ballad songs are slow yet simplistic in singing style.

Ballad and pop 
Debuting in 1976, Hey Eun-yi's pop ballad "You Wouldn't Know" (당신은 모르실거야), with its slow, melancholic rhythm, became extremely well-received.

Ballad and rock 
With a stronger emphasis on the rhythm, along with the inclusion of instruments more closely related to the rock genre, such as the drums and guitar, rock ballads can ramp up to a faster pace and higher power than classic sentimental ballads. Yim Jae-beom's song "For You" (임재범 너를 위해; 2000), begins softly with a keyboard accompanying his singing. However, the song quickly builds with each refrain getting louder than before along with the inclusion of drum accompaniment. As the song continues, the emotion of the song is portrayed by an electric guitar solo. Other popular rock ballad groups include Boohwal.

The initial wave of popularity in response to rock music in Korea ended before the rise of ballads in the 1980s. However, revivals of the genre since that have allowed to new experimentation within the genre.

Other intersections 
Folk music in Korea arose from anti-government movements in the 1970s which consisted largely of college students. Because of its simplistic nature (use of few instruments), it was easy to perform, alluding to its popular name t'ong g'ita ("barrel guitar") named after the barrel which people would sit on while playing instruments.

Ballad & folk 
Popular balladeer Lee Sun-hee has numerous songs that represent a "Korean interpretation of American folk music" through the emphasis of acoustic guitar, such as her song "If You Love Me" (그대가 나를 사랑하신다면; 1991). This song elaborates on how someone should feel if they were truly in love and how that should manifest into their actions toward their loved one (the singer). Throughout the song, a piano melody accompanies Lee Sun-hee until breaks into slower, more melancholic refrains where the soft twang of an acoustic guitar takes the place of the piano.

References 

Korean styles of music
Rhythm and blues
 Korean ballad